De La Salle North High School is a private, coeducational, Roman Catholic high school in Portland, Oregon, United States. It is a part of the Roman Catholic Archdiocese of Portland. The school is located in the Cully neighborhood, co-locating with the St. Charles Parish; De La Salle renovated the old parish elementary school wing and built a commons, courtyard and gymnasium. The doors to the new campus were opened on September 7, 2021.

Background
De La Salle North Catholic High School was founded in 2001. It is sponsored by the De La Salle Christian Brothers and is a part of the Roman Catholic Archdiocese of Portland/Western Oregon. The founding president was Matthew D. Powell. The current president is Oscar Leong, and the current principal is Erin Reid. De La Salle was one of the founding members of the Cristo Rey Network of high schools, the first school after Cristo Rey Jesuit High School Chicago to follow this model. By 2018 there were 37 schools in the network.

De La Salle North Catholic primarily serves the inner-city families of north and north-east Portland. An integrated Corporate Work Study Program pays for most of their tuition. Students attend class four days a week and work for a local company one day, gaining work experience, business contacts, and preparing them for education at a four-year college.

Activities 
Clubs sponsored by the school include  Anime, Art, Chess, Earth, Hiking, Poetry, Sci Fi, Spectrum, and Ski & Snowboard. Other activities include: cheerleading, Peer Helpers, Student Council, and Constitution Team. Service projects, retreats, and leadership opportunities are offered through the Campus Ministry department.

Sports
The mascot of the school is a kneeling knight.

In 2004, after four years in existence, the De La Salle Knights boys soccer team finished second in the Oregon 2A state playoffs of the Oregon School Activities Association. They defeated the Oregon Episcopal School Aardvarks in the regional playoffs, but then lost 0–5 to Catlin Gabel in the championship game. In 2017, the De La Salle Knights' boy soccer team ranked 5th in state. The boys soccer team would reach the playoffs facing Delphian The Delphian School. The boys soccer team will end up winning 1-0. Next up they would face the 4th rank St. Mary's School (Medford, Oregon), the game would finish 2-2, De La Salle defeated St. Marys in extra time. For the first time since 2004, the De La Salle Knights Boys soccer team would reach the OSAA 3A/2A/1A semifinals but would end up losing to the eventually state champions Riverside Junior/Senior High School 4–0.

In 2014, the Knights' boys' basketball team finished second in Oregon 3A state playoffs, losing to rival Valley Catholic. Reaching the state playoffs again in 2015, the Knights finished in 4th place. Then in 2016, the Knights' boys' basketball team finished second, losing to St. Mary's of Medford in the championship game.

References

External links
 De La Salle North Catholic High School (official website)
 More than a Dream (official book site)
Cristo Rey Network
 Partners - Cristo Rey Network 
 Fr. John P. Foley honored with Presidential Citizen's Medal
60 minutes
Cristo Rey Featured in WashPost column by George Will
 Boston Globe - With sense of purpose, students cut class for a day 
 Bill & Melinda Gates Foundation - Success of Innovative Urban Catholic School Sparks Major Investment

Roman Catholic Archdiocese of Portland in Oregon
Catholic secondary schools in Oregon
Lasallian schools in the United States
High schools in Portland, Oregon
Poverty-related organizations
Educational institutions established in 2001
Cristo Rey Network
Schools accredited by the Northwest Accreditation Commission
2001 establishments in Oregon
Kenton, Portland, Oregon